Drop City is a 2003 novel by American author T. C. Boyle. The novel, set in various years from the early 1960s to late 1970s, describes the social evolution of a group of eight counter-cultural nudists in a commune based on the real Drop City, Colorado. However, Boyle's fictional group initially live in California and later move to a remote part of Alaska, and the group shares many qualities with the real Sonoma County Morning Star commune. The novel was a finalist for the 2003 National Book Award.

Book information

Hardcover –  (First edition, February 24, 2003), published by Viking Press
Paperback –  (January 27, 2004), published by Penguin Books

References

External links
 T.C. Boyle official web site
 Review of Drop City
 Reviews of Drop City

2003 American novels
Novels by T. C. Boyle
Fiction set in 1960
Fiction set in 1961
Fiction set in 1962
Fiction set in 1963
Fiction set in 1968
Fiction set in 1969
Fiction set in 1970
Fiction set in 1971
Fiction set in 1976
Fiction set in 1977
Fiction set in 1978
Fiction set in 1979
Novels set in the 1960s
Novels set in the 1970s
Novels set in California
Novels set in Alaska
Viking Press books
Nudity